Hemujing is a township under the administration of Xinji City in southern Hebei province, China, located over  east of downtown Xinji. , it has 18 villages under its administration.

See also
List of township-level divisions of Hebei

References

Township-level divisions of Hebei